Peace Island (Chinese: 和平岛), is an island located in Huajiachi, Hangzhou, Zhejiang Province, People's Republic of China.

Introduction
The island is located in Hujiachi (in Huajiachi Campus, Zhejiang University), which is the second largest lake in Hangzhou, after West Lake. 

The island was naturally formed, but later enlarged artificially. In the 1980s and 1990s, Chinese pavilions and other traditional structures were built on the island. Currently it boasts two pavilions, some statues and a grove of trees.

The island provides a place for relaxation and beautiful vistas of both the lake and the campus. In years past, an annual boat race was held on Hujiachi, and the spectators, cheerleaders and judges would watch from the island.

Essays by Zhejiang University alumni and other Hangzhou writers often mention this small but beautiful island.

References

External links
 Peace Island in Huajiachi Campus, Zhejiang University (Introduction & Photos)
 Photos & comments of Peace Island (Baidu Discussion Board)
 A typical Chinese blog writing an essay in memorial of the island and Huajiachi

Huajiachi Campus, Zhejiang University